Datuk Seri Panglima Ahmad Said bin Hamdan (Jawi: أحمد سيد بن حمدان; died 22 September 2019) was a Malaysian civil servant who served as the first chief commissioner of the Malaysian Anti-Corruption Commission (MACC) when it was created from the preceding Anti-Corruption Agency (ACA).

Career 
Ahmad Said succeeded Zulkipli Mat Noor as director-general of the ACA in mid-May 2007 after the latter's contract was not renewed amidst graft allegations. When the ACA was upgraded into a full commission body known as the MACC, Ahmad Said was in turn, made its first chief commissioner.

On 4 December 2009, the Chief Secretary to the Government of Malaysia, Mohamad Sidek Hassan, announced that Ahmad Said has opted for early retirement at the end of 2009 with his contract due to expire in May 2010. His term officially came to an end on 31 December 2009 instead of 25 May 2010. On the following day, he released a statement denying that his early retirement was due to pressure from outsiders or political parties. He added that his retirement was due to his own personal reasons and after having served in the commission for a long period rather than because of other reasons. Ahmad Said said he retired early to give way to his successor and to spend time with his family after serving with the MACC for 34 years. Then-prime minister, Mohammad Najib Abdul Razak, also reiterated that Ahmad Said retired early because he wanted to spend more time with his family and that it has nothing to do with Teoh Beng Hock's death. The government also did not request him to retire 6 months earlier.

Honours 
  :
  Officer of the Order of the Defender of the Realm (KMN) (1992)
  Commander of the Order of Meritorious Service (PJN) - Datuk (2008)
  :
  Knight Commander of the Exalted Order of Malacca (DCSM) - Datuk Wira (2009)
  :
  Grand Knight of the Order of Sultan Ahmad Shah of Pahang (SSAP) - Dato' Sri (2008)
  :
  Officer of the Order of the Defender of State (DSPN) - Dato' (1999)
  Commander of the Order of the Defender of State (DGPN) - Dato' Seri (2008)
  :
  Knight Commander of the Order of the Crown of Perlis (DPMP) - Dato' (2002)
  :
  Commander of the Order of Kinabalu (PGDK) - Datuk (2000)
  Grand Commander of the Order of Kinabalu (PGDK) - Datuk Seri Panglima (2007)

Death 
Ahmad Said died on the night of 22 September 2019 at his daughter's house in Rawang. He had previously been admitted to the National Heart Institute of Malaysia (IJN) after suffering from stroke.

See also 
 Tan Boon Wah v. Datuk Seri Ahmad Said Hamdan, Ketua Suruhanjaya, Suruhanjaya Pencegahan Rasuah Malaysia and Others

References 

Date of birth missing
2019 deaths
People from Penang
Malaysian Muslims
Malaysian people of Malay descent
Commanders of the Order of Meritorious Service
Officers of the Order of the Defender of the Realm
Grand Commanders of the Order of Kinabalu
Commanders of the Order of Kinabalu
Indiana State University alumni